The Hitler teapot (also called the Hitler tea kettle; officially the Michael Graves Design Bells and Whistles Stainless Steel Tea Kettle) was a stainless-steel kettle sold in 2013 by the American retailer and department store chain JCPenney. It attracted attention on social media due to its perceived resemblance to the Nazi German dictator Adolf Hitler.

Background 
The kettle was part of a collection of products designed by the American architect and designer Michael Graves for JCPenney. It first attracted attention in May 2013 when a photograph of a billboard advertising the product on Interstate 405 in Culver City, California, was posted online, and Internet users, especially of the social news aggregator Reddit, noted the kettle's perceived resemblance to Adolf Hitler, the dictator of Nazi Germany from 1933 to 1945. The kettle's design incorporated a black handle and lid top that many users interpreted to look like Hitler's parted hairstyle and toothbrush moustache, as well as a spout that was thought to resemble a right arm raised in a Nazi salute. In a poll of KPCC listeners, roughly 31 percent thought it resembled the dictator, while roughly 25 percent thought it did not.

Response 
Due to the media attention, JCPenney removed the billboard that sparked the initial heightened interest in the product, and said that any resemblance of the kettle to Hitler was unintentional, stating in a tweet: "If we'd designed the kettle to look like something, we would've gone [with a] snowman". The Hitler teapot has been cited as an example of pareidolia, a phenomenon in which individuals perceive meaningful images or patterns in  otherwise random formations. Writing in Haaretz, Gavriel Rosenfeld characterised the popularity of the Hitler teapot as being part of a wider phenomenon of "Hitlerization" and Hitler memes.

Due to its notoriety, the kettle sold out at JCPenney's stores, with some later reappearing on eBay, priced as high as $199, much higher than the original retail price of $40.

See also 
 Adolf Hitler in popular culture
 Cats That Look Like Hitler
 Internet meme
 Pareidolia

References 

teapot
JCPenney
Internet memes introduced in 2013
Teapots
Viral marketing